Fernandocrambus is a genus of moths of the family Crambidae.

Species
Fernandocrambus abbreviata (J. F. G. Clarke, 1965)
Fernandocrambus annulata (Aurivillius, 1922)
Fernandocrambus apocalipsus Bleszynski, 1967
Fernandocrambus arcus J. F. G. Clarke, 1965
Fernandocrambus augur Bleszynski, 1965
Fernandocrambus backstromi Aurivillius, 1922
Fernandocrambus brunneus Aurivillius, 1922
Fernandocrambus byssifera (J. F. G. Clarke, 1965)
Fernandocrambus chilianellus (Hampson, 1919)
Fernandocrambus chillanicus (Butler, 1883)
Fernandocrambus chiloma (J. F. G. Clarke, 1965)
Fernandocrambus chopinellus Bleszynski, 1967
Fernandocrambus corvus J. F. G. Clarke, 1965
Fernandocrambus cuprescens (Hampson, 1919)
Fernandocrambus derelicta (J. F. G. Clarke, 1965)
Fernandocrambus diabolicus Bleszynski, 1967
Fernandocrambus divus (J. F. G. Clarke, 1965)
Fernandocrambus dolicaon Bleszynski, 1967
Fernandocrambus euryptellus (Berg, 1877)
Fernandocrambus falklandicellus (Hampson, 1896)
Fernandocrambus fernandesellus (Hampson, 1896)
Fernandocrambus fundus J. F. G. Clarke, 1965
Fernandocrambus fuscus Aurivillius, 1922
Fernandocrambus glareola (J. F. G. Clarke, 1965
Fernandocrambus grisea (J. F. G. Clarke, 1965
Fernandocrambus harpipterus (Dyar, 1916)
Fernandocrambus horoscopus Bleszynski, 1967
Fernandocrambus imitator (J. F. G. Clarke, 1965)
Fernandocrambus imperfecta (J. F. G. Clarke, 1965)
Fernandocrambus kuscheli J. F. G. Clarke, 1965
Fernandocrambus loxia (J. F. G. Clarke, 1965)
Fernandocrambus magnifica (J. F. G. Clarke, 1965)
Fernandocrambus minima (J. F. G. Clarke, 1965)
Fernandocrambus nergaellus (Druce, 1896)
Fernandocrambus nitidissima (J. F. G. Clarke, 1965)
Fernandocrambus noskiewiczi Bleszynski, 1967
Fernandocrambus oxyechus J. F. G. Clarke, 1965
Fernandocrambus paraloxia (J. F. G. Clarke, 1965)
Fernandocrambus parva (J. F. G. Clarke, 1965)
Fernandocrambus pepita (J. F. G. Clarke, 1965)
Fernandocrambus radicellus (Hampson, 1896)
Fernandocrambus ruptifascia (Hampson, 1919)
Fernandocrambus spiculellus (Zeller, 1877)
Fernandocrambus stilatus (Zeller, 1877)
Fernandocrambus straminellus (Hampson, 1896)
Fernandocrambus subaequalis (Zeller, 1877)
Fernandocrambus truncus J. F. G. Clarke, 1965
Fernandocrambus variatellus Bleszynski, 1967
Fernandocrambus xerophylla (J. F. G. Clarke, 1965)
Fernandocrambus xiphiellus (Zeller, 1872)

References

Crambini
Crambidae genera
Taxa named by Per Olof Christopher Aurivillius